Perry Danos is a Nashville recording artist.  He is signed with GrandVista Music, and has his debut album coming out May 2009. He has appeared in numerous music videos, including those for recording artists Randy Travis and Gretchen Wilson.  His voice can be heard on national commercials for brands like Coca-Cola, Toyota, Southwest Airlines, Wendy's, Coors Brewing Company, and Budweiser.  He gained notoriety in Nashville by performing on the General Jackson (riverboat), and also with the Pat Patrick Band.  He has performed for political figures like Rush Limbaugh, 
Al Gore, George W. Bush, and Bill Clinton. In addition, Perry Danos has worked with Donna Summer, Raul Malo, Wayne Newton, Four Tops, Martina McBride, Leon Russell, and Tony Bennett.

Perry Danos was set to sing the National Anthem at the Chicago White Sox game on May 7, 2009. On May 8, 2009, James J. Sexton (the mayor of the Village of Evergreen Park a suburb of Chicago) dedicated May 8 as "Perry Danos Day."

References

Musicians from Nashville, Tennessee
Year of birth missing (living people)
Living people
Place of birth missing (living people)